(Am I Trying) (Tora-san Our Lovable Tramp) is a 1969 Japanese comedy film directed by Yoji Yamada and starring Kiyoshi Atsumi. It is the first entry in the popular, long-running Otoko wa Tsurai yo series.

Synopsis
Torajiro Kuruma (Kiyoshi Atsumi) returns for the first time in 20 years to the neighborhood where he was born, Shibamata in Katsushika, Tokyo, He comes back in the middle of Taishakuten temple's Koshin Shinko Festival. After jumping into the festival procession, he has a teary reunion with his uncle (Shin Morikawa), aunt (Chieko Misaki), and his sister Sakura (Chieko Baisho). The next day, he joins his sister at her at a matchmaking meeting with the son of a company president. Tora's boorish and drunken behavior at the meeting ruins Sakura's chances of marriage. After getting into a huge fight with his uncle over his behavior at the meeting, he leaves home and heads to Nara. While there, he meets and falls in love with a young woman named Fuyuko. They return to Shibamata together and spend time together as if they were couple. At the same time, Sakura meets a print shop worker, Hiroshi (Gin Maeda). While Sakura and Hiroshi get married, Tora's relationship with Fuyuko is fleeting, as she is engaged to another man. Broken-hearted, Torajiro leaves after writing a letter of advice for Fuyuko, asking her to help take care of his sister and her new baby.

Cast
 Kiyoshi Atsumi as Torajiro
 Chieko Baisho as Sakura
 Sachiko Mitsumoto as Fuyuko Tsubouchi
 Chishū Ryū as Gozen-sama
 Takashi Shimura as Hyōichirō Suwa
 Shin Morikawa as Kuruma Tatsuzō
 Gin Maeda as Hiroshi Suwa
 Masaaki Tsusaka as Noboru Kawamata
 Gajirō Satō as Genkichi (Man at the Temple)
 Keiroku Seki as Master of Ceremonies
 Chieko Misaki as Tsune Kuruma (Torajiro's aunt)
 Hisao Dazai as Tarō Ume (Print Shop)
 Shunsuke Ōmi as Manager
 Taichirō Hirokawa as Michio
 Fusatarō Ishijima as Michio's father
 Matsuko Shiga as Michio's mother

Critical appraisal
The Mainichi Film Awards and the Kinema Junpo Awards chose Kiyoshi Atsumi as the Best Actor for his role in It's Tough Being a Man, and Yoji Yamada was given the Best Director prize at the Mainichi Film Awards. The Japanese academic film magazine Kinema Junpo gives It's Tough Being a Man a rating of five out of five stars.

Availability
It's Tough Being a Man was released theatrically on August 27, 1969. In Japan, the film was released on videotape in 1995 and 1996, and in DVD format in 2008. AnimEigo released the film on DVD in the US along with the other first four films in the Otoko wa Tsurai yo series on November 24, 2009.

References

External links
 
 It's Tough Being a Man at www.tora-san.jp (official site)

1969 films
Films directed by Yoji Yamada
1960s Japanese-language films
Otoko wa Tsurai yo films
Shochiku films
Films shot in Tokyo
Films with screenplays by Yôji Yamada
1969 comedy films
1960s Japanese films